Edgars Gruzītis (14 March 1912 – 19 May 1950) was a Latvian cross-country skier. He competed in the men's relay event at the 1936 Winter Olympics.

References

1912 births
1950 deaths
Latvian male cross-country skiers
Latvian male Nordic combined skiers
Olympic cross-country skiers of Latvia
Olympic Nordic combined skiers of Latvia
Cross-country skiers at the 1936 Winter Olympics
Nordic combined skiers at the 1936 Winter Olympics
Sportspeople from Riga
20th-century Latvian people